Kevin Van Hove-Speltincx (born 15 October 1983) is a Belgium former professional snooker player. He is the former European Snooker Champion.

Career
In 2004, Van Hove entered the Belgian Amateur Championship, defeating Jim Spapen 7–1 in the final to win the championship for the first time.

In 2007 at the EBSA European Snooker Championship, he managed to advance to the final in which he defeated Rodney Goggins 7–2. He then also prevailed at the EBSA International Play-Off and secured a place on the Main Tour for the 2007/2008 snooker season. However he only recorded two victories over Kurt Maflin and Drew Henry, and returned to amateur status at the end of the season.

Performance and rankings timeline

Career finals

Amateur finals: 8 (4 titles)

External links

Living people
Belgian snooker players
1983 births